Ivan Rijavec (born 1951) is an Australian architect.

Early life
Rijavec was born in Trnovo, PR Slovenia, at the time part of Yugoslavia, in 1951. When he was one year old, his family emigrated to Australia, settling in a coastal town of Albany, Western Australia.

Education
Rijavec attributes his earliest architectural influence to the Italian structural engineer and architect Pier Luigi Nervi’s innovative work in concrete. He cites the spatial quality of Palazzo Dello Sport’s dome as having ignited his architectural interests when in 1968 he stumbled on a faded small black and white photograph of it in an engineering volume extolling the virtues of pre-cast concrete.

In 1969, Rijavec enrolled in architecture at Curtin University, Western Australia. Whilst completing the first tier of the course, he won a bursary postponing his degree to undertake a study tour of Europe tracing the development of Western Civilisation through Greece, central and Western Europe. He remained in Europe for six years travelling, studying and working predominantly in London and Umeå, Sweden.

Work in Australia
In 1977, Rijavec returned to Australia completing his bachelors and master's degrees at RMIT in 1979 and 1992. After a period working at Bates Smart, he was appointed associate director in 1985 and subsequent to his design role on the Coronial Services Centre was headhunted as a design leader at the Victorian Public Works Department. There he worked on a government initiative to raise Victorian design standards in the Justice and Tafe Groups before devoting himself exclusively to his own practice in 1988.

From the late 1980s till present, Rijavec Architects have had a prodigious output, receiving 10 professional awards and numerous other commendations for outstanding architecture. Over the same period Rijavec taught at the RMIT University of Technology Department of Architecture and served on numerous professional advisory panels, competition and design juries. His architecture employs unique curvilinear geometries in the creation of forms and spaces that have been described as sculptural, intensely intimate and poetic. As the scale and breadth of his projects increased, his focus broadened to include Australian urbanism. Rijavec was included in Melbourne Masters Architecture exhibition held in November 2004 TarraWarra Museum of Art | Exhibitions that exhibited the works of some of Melbourne’s most celebrated architects.

Controversy
In 2003, Rijavec assumed the role of architect-developer on a major inner urban development comprising an urban block in Melbourne’s oldest suburb, Fitzroy. The project, NKYA, (an acronym for Napier, Kerr, Young and Argyle Streets that border the site), comprised a mixed use development including cafes, offices and a predominance of apartments. It was the largest conceived in Fitzroy’s history prompting mass public protests.

The popular press dubbed it "the cheese grater" (alluding to the distinctive conical forms of one of its corner elements). The complex was designed to provide 136 apartments in structures ranging between five and eight stories in height in three separate buildings of different architectural characters. Despite strong opposition by residents action groups and the Yarra City council, the project won approval at the Victorian Civil and Administrative Tribunal (VCAT). This was largely as a result of Rijavec establishing the project’s contextual relevance in an unprecedented appraisal of Fitzroy’s urban character that reinterpreted it as Urban Jazz.

Venice Biennale
"NOW+WHEN Australian Urbanism", inspired by Rijavec’s interest in Australian urbanism was selected as Australia’s 12th Venice Architecture Biennale exhibition for 2010. The exhibition co-directed by photographer John Gollings refocusses the Australian identity from the "outback", to its coastal urban centres where 93% of its population now lives. The exhibition comprises a survey of Australian Urbanism NOW and allegorical speculations on Australia’s Urban future, WHEN, set from 2050 into the distant future. The exhibition has been conceived as a time capsule of Australian Urbanism taken in 2010 that includes speculations on its urban future.

Projects
1986 Coronial Services Centre, Victoria, Australia
1987 Whittlesea TAFE College, Victoria, Australia
1989 Lara Shoe Factory, Fitzroy, Victoria, Australia
1989 Manifold Residence, Brunswick, Victoria, Australia
1991 Municipal Offices Caulfield, Victoria, Australia
1994 Freeland Residence, Fitzroy, Victoria, Australia
1997 Alessio Residence, Templestowe, Victoria, Australia
1997 Penthouse, Melbourne, Victoria, Australia
1998 Chen Residence, Kew, Victoria, Australia

Awards

1984 Merricks Music Room RAIA RAIA AWARD
1985 Wurruk Primary School FINALIST RAIA
1986 Warehouse Conversion, Commercial/Residential FINALIST RAIA
1986 RMIT School of Architecture (Contracted at BSM)   FINALIST RAIA
1987 Ivan Rijavec Architects Office RAIA AWARD
1988 Coronial Services Centre, (Contracted at BSM)  FINALIST RAIA
1989 Price Waterhouse Building, (Contracted, BSM award)  RAIA AWARD
1989 Architects Residence FINALIST RAIA
1989 Fine Art Gallery, (David Ellis Fine Art)   RAIA AWARD
1989 Fine Art Gallery, (David Ellis Fine Art)    FINALIST RAIA   (National)
1990 Warehouse Conversion, Commercial/Residential RAIA AWARD
1991 Foards Freeholds, Commercial/studio conversion FINALIST RAIA
1991 Caulfield Town Hall RAIA AWARD
1992 Warehouse Conversion, Commercial/studio FINALIST RAIA
1993 Panorama Gallery & Electronic Projection Cinema RAIA AWARD
1994 Francis Residence RAIA Prize
1994 Fitzroy Swimming Pool, Institutional Category. FINALIST RAIA
1994 Freeland Residence, Interiors Category. FINALIST RAIA
1994 Freeland Residence, Residential Alterations Cat. FINALIST RAIA
1994 Freeland Residence MBAV House of the year RAIA AWARD
1995 Freeland Residence RAIA AWARD
1997 Alessio Residence FINALIST RAIA
1997 357 Little Bourke Street, Melbourne. Penthouse FINALIST RAIA
1998 Seppelt Contemporary Art Award, Museum of Contemporary Art NSW Nomination

Literature
Architects For The New Millennium, Images Publishing Group 2000
Australian Interior Design Manual, Tibor Hubay, Allen & Unwin 1989
Melbourne Architecture, Watermark Press, Philip Goad 1999
New Australian Style, Jon Michell & John Gollings, Thames & Hudson 1999
Picturing Architecture, Anne Pedden & Desley Luscombe 1992
Pure Form (Works by Ivan Rijavec), Images Publishing Group 2000
Australian Architecture Now, Davina Jackson & Chris Johnson, Thames & Hudson 2000

References

External links
http://www.rijavec.com/ - Rijavec Architects official website

1951 births
Architects from Melbourne
Living people
Australian people of Slovenian descent
Yugoslav emigrants to Australia